Wulensi is one of the constituencies represented in the Parliament of Ghana. It elects one Member of Parliament (MP) by the first past the post system of election. Wulensi is located in the Nanumba South district of the Northern Region of Ghana.

Boundaries
The seat is located entirely within the Nanumba South district of the Northern Region of Ghana.

Members of Parliament 

Following the death of the independent MP Alhaji Saani Iddi in early June 2012, the Electoral Commission of Ghana set 31 July 2012 as the date for a by-election following registration of candidates on 3 July and 4 July 2012.

Elections

 
 
 
 
 
 
 
 

 
 
 
 
 
 
 
 

Wumbei Kofi Karim (NPP), a teacher, won the by-election held on 4 March 2002 with a majority of 894 following the disqualification of the incumbent MP, Samuel Nyimakan of the NDC by the Supreme Court of Ghana on 15 January 2003.

See also
List of Ghana Parliament constituencies

References 

Parliamentary constituencies in the Northern Region (Ghana)